= Maulana Mohammad Amin =

Persian statesman

Maulana Mohammad Amin (Persian: مولانا محمد امین) was a Persian statesman in Safavid Iran, who served as the munshi al-mamalik ("state scribe") and was the head of the insha al-mamalik ("imperial correspondence") under Shah Abbas I from 1588 till his death in 1591/2. He was the grandson of Maulana Adham, who was a prominent chancellery official during the late reign of Ismail I, and the early reign of the latter’s successor Tahmasp I.

== Sources ==
- Mitchell, Colin P. (2009). The Practice of Politics in Safavid Iran: Power, Religion and Rhetoric. I.B.Tauris. pp. 1–304. ISBN 978-0857715883.

Unknown	Munshi al-mamalik 1588–1591/2	Unknown
